3212 Agricola, provisional designation , is a stony Flora asteroid from the inner regions of the asteroid belt, approximately 5 kilometers in diameter. It was discovered by Finnish astronomer Yrjö Väisälä at Turku Observatory in Southwest Finland, on 19 February 1938, and named after reformer Mikael Agricola.

Orbit and classification 

The S-type asteroid is a member of the Flora family, one of the largest groups of stony asteroids in the main-belt. It orbits the Sun in the inner main-belt at a distance of 1.9–2.6 AU once every 3 years and 5 months (1,238 days). Its orbit has an eccentricity of 0.15 and an inclination of 8° with respect to the ecliptic.

Physical characteristics 

A rotational lightcurve obtained from photometric observations by Czech astronomer Petr Pravec in May 2006, rendered a period of 9 hours with a brightness variation of 0.07 in magnitude. According to the survey carried out by the NEOWISE mission of NASA's space-based Wide-field Infrared Survey Explorer, the asteroid measures 4.4 kilometers in diameter, and its surface has a high albedo of 0.39, while the Collaborative Asteroid Lightcurve Link assumes an intermediate albedo of 0.24 – derived from 8 Flora, the largest member and namesake of this orbital family – and calculates a larger diameter of 5.4 kilometers.

Naming 

This minor planet was named in honor of Finnish clergyman Mikael Agricola (c. 1510–1557), bishop and reformer of Finland, often called "father of Finnish literature". He published his Abckiria, the first book printed in the Finnish language, and translated the New Testament into Finnish. The official naming citation was published by the Minor Planet Center on 27 June 1991.

Notes

References

External links 
 Asteroid Lightcurve Database (LCDB), query form (info )
 Dictionary of Minor Planet Names, Google books
 Asteroids and comets rotation curves, CdR – Observatoire de Genève, Raoul Behrend
 Discovery Circumstances: Numbered Minor Planets (1)-(5000) – Minor Planet Center
 
 

003212
Discoveries by Yrjö Väisälä
Named minor planets
19380219